The Australasian Performing Right Association Awards of 2008 (generally known as APRA Awards) are a series of awards which include the APRA Music Awards, Classical Music Awards, and Screen Music Awards. The APRA Music Awards ceremony occurred on 16 June at the Sydney Hilton, they were presented by APRA and the Australasian Mechanical Copyright Owners Society (AMCOS). The Classical Music Awards were distributed in July in Sydney and are sponsored by APRA and the Australian Music Centre (AMC). The Screen Music Awards were issued in November by APRA and Australian Guild of Screen Composers (AGSC).

Awards
Nominees and winners with results indicated on the right.

See also
Music of Australia

References

External links
APRA official website
APRA Awards - History

2008 in Australian music
2008 music awards
APRA Awards